Gustavo André Tabalipa, known as Gustavo Tabalipa or simply Gustavo (born 28 January 1993), is a Brazilian retired footballer who played as a central defender.

Career
Born in Rolim de Moura, Gustavo Tabalipa graduated from Portuguesa's youth categories, after representing Goiás, Internacional and Santos. He made his first team – and Série A – debut on 18 August 2013, starting in a 1–3 home loss against Botafogo.

In the 2014 summer Gustavo Tabalipa suffered a serious knee injury, being sidelined for the remainder of the season. He returned to the fields in the following year, but appeared rarely before being released on 12 June 2015.

On 2 January 2016 Gustavo Tabalipa joined Bragantino. After only two appearances, he left the club and subsequently retired from professional football, later starting a medical degree.

References

External links

1993 births
Living people
Sportspeople from Rondônia
Brazilian footballers
Association football defenders
Campeonato Brasileiro Série A players
Campeonato Brasileiro Série B players
Associação Portuguesa de Desportos players
Clube Atlético Bragantino players